The governor of Surigao del Norte, is the chief executive of the provincial government of Surigao del Norte.

Provincial Governors of Surigao (1899-1960)

Provincial Governors of Surigao del Norte (1960-2025)

References

Governors of Surigao del Norte
Surigao del Norte